Gregory Francis Soto (born June 3, 1986) is an American mixed martial artist. Soto is a black belt in Brazilian Jiu-Jitsu

Mixed martial arts record

|-
|Loss
|align=center|9–3
|George Sullivan
|KO (punch)
|CFFC 14
|
|align=center|1
|align=center|2:09
|Atlantic City, New Jersey, United States
|
|-
|Win
|align=center|9–2
|Chip Moraza-Pollard 
|Submission (triangle choke)
|CFFC 12
|
|align=center|2
|align=center|4:07
|Atlantic City, New Jersey, United States
|
|-
|Loss
|align=center|8–2
|Daniel Roberts
|Submission (kimura)
|UFC 125
|
|align=center|1
|align=center|3:45
|Las Vegas, Nevada, United States
|
|-
|Win
|align=center|8–1
|Nick Osipczak
|Decision (unanimous)
|UFC 118
|
|align=center|3
|align=center|5:00
|Boston, Massachusetts, United States
|
|-
|Loss
|align=center|7–1
|Matthew Riddle
|DQ (illegal upkick)
|UFC 111
|
|align=center|3
|align=center|1:30
|Newark, New Jersey, United States
|
|-
|Win
|align=center|7–0
|Ray Steinbeiss
|Submission (rear-naked choke)
|Beatdown at 4 Bears 5
|
|align=center|2
|align=center|4:10
|New Town, North Dakota, United States
|
|-
|Win
|align=center|6–0
|Craig Kaufmann
|Decision (unanimous)
|WCA: Caged Combat
|
|align=center|3
|align=center|5:00
|Atlantic City, New Jersey, United States
|
|-
|Win
|align=center|5–0
|Shawn Formann
|Submission (D'arce choke)
|Ring of Combat 23
|
|align=center|2
|align=center|3:44
|Atlantic City, New Jersey, United States
|
|-
|Win
|align=center|4–0
|Doug Gordon
|Decision (unanimous)
|Ring of Combat 21
|
|align=center|3
|align=center|5:00
|Atlantic City, New Jersey, United States
|
|-
|Win
|align=center|3–0
|Sergio Vinagre
|KO (punch)
|BCX 1 - Cage Xtreme 1
|
|align=center|1
|align=center|3:36
|New Jersey, United States
|
|-
|Win
|align=center|2–0
|Hyun Gyu Lim
|Submission (armbar)
|World Best Fighter: USA vs. Asia
|
|align=center|1
|align=center|0:58
|Atlantic City, New Jersey, United States
|
|-
|Win
|align=center|1–0
|Dave Church
|TKO (corner stoppage) 
|CITC: Marked Territory
|
|align=center|1
|align=center|5:00
|Lincroft, New Jersey, United States
|

References

External links
 
 

Living people
American male mixed martial artists
Mixed martial artists utilizing Brazilian jiu-jitsu
American practitioners of Brazilian jiu-jitsu
People awarded a black belt in Brazilian jiu-jitsu
Monmouth University alumni
Mixed martial artists from New Jersey
Sportspeople from New York (state)
1986 births
Ultimate Fighting Championship male fighters